Franklin D. Roosevelt, the 32nd President of the United States, has inspired or been portrayed in numerous cultural works.

Fictional literature

The Golden Age, a 2000 novel by Gore Vidal
Southern Victory series by Harry Turtledove
The War That Came Early series by Harry Turtledove
 Worldwar series by Harry Turtledove
 The Plot Against America (2004) novel by Philip Roth
 Axis of Time novel by John Birmingham
The Proteus Operation by James P. Hogan
 Hitler's Peace by Philip Kerr

Film
Yankee Doodle Dandy, a 1942 film
This is the Army, a 1943 film
Mission to Moscow, a 1943 film
The Beginning or the End, a 1947 docudrama
Beau James, a 1957 film
Sunrise at Campobello, a 1960 film based on the play of the same name
The Private Files of J. Edgar Hoover, a 1977 film
Annie, a 1982 adaptation of the musical of the same name
Pearl Harbor, a 2001 film
FDR: American Badass!, a 2012 film
Hyde Park on Hudson, a 2012 film
The Monuments Men, a 2014 film
Darkest Hour, a 2017 film

Television
Eleanor and Franklin, a 1976 television miniseries
Eleanor and Franklin: The White House Years, a 1977 television film
The Winds of War, a 1983 miniseries
War and Remembrance, a 1989 miniseries and sequel to The Winds of War
The Kennedys of Massachusetts, a 1990 television film
World War II: When Lions Roared, 1994 biographical miniseries
Truman, a 1995 television film
Winchell, a 1998 television film
Annie, a 1999 television movie adaptation of the musical of the same name
Warm Springs, a 2005 television film
Into the Storm, a 2009 television film
All the Presidents' Heads, a 2011 episode of the television series Futurama
The World Wars, a 2014 documentary miniseries
The Roosevelts, a 2014 documentary film depicting the Roosevelt family
Atlantic Crossing, 2020 television series
The New Deal (Agents of S.H.I.E.L.D.), a 2020 episode of the television series Agents of S.H.I.E.L.D.
The First Lady, a 2022 television series.

Theatrical productions
Annie, a 1976 musical
I'd Rather Be Right, a 1937 musical
Sunrise at Campobello, a 1958 play

Video games
Civilization, a series of turn-based strategy games
Hearts of Iron, a series of grand strategy games depicting World War II
The Political Machine, a series of presidential campaign simulation games

Other works
Ace Kilroy, a webcomic

Other depictions
Presidential $1 Coin Program
Roosevelt dime

See also
List of memorials to Franklin D. Roosevelt
He is the subject of the song, "Papa Roosevelt," a song in Spanish by the Puerto Rican group, Los Jardineros, which can be found on YouTube.

References